Venator is a genus of Australian wolf spiders first described by Henry Roughton Hogg in 1900.  it contains only three species.

References

External links

 
 

Araneomorphae genera
Lycosidae
Taxa described in 1900